The FIS Alpine World Ski Championships 2021 were held from 8–21 February in Cortina d'Ampezzo, Italy. In May 2020, the Italian Winter Sports Federation (FISI) and the event organizing committee asked the International Ski Federation (FIS) to postpone the event until 2022 due to the COVID-19 pandemic, however, the request was rejected by FIS, and the organizers then moved forward with plans for 2021.

The host city was selected at the FIS Congress in Cancún, Mexico, on 10 June 2016. Cortina d'Ampezzo was the only applicant, and had been a finalist for the previous two championships.

Cortina previously hosted the world championships in 1932 and 1956 (Winter Olympics) and has held numerous World Cup events; the Tofane is a regular stop for women's speed events in January. It is scheduled to host the alpine skiing events of the 2026 Winter Olympics.

This was the seventh edition in Italy; in addition to Cortina, other sites were Bormio (2005, 1985), Sestriere (1997), and Val Gardena (1970). Sestriere was also the alpine host for the 2006 Winter Olympics, with women's speed events at San Sicario.

Russia doping ban
On 9 December 2019, the World Anti-Doping Agency (WADA) banned Russia from all international sport for a period of four years, after the Russian government was found to have tampered with laboratory data that it provided to WADA in January 2019 as a condition of the Russian Anti-Doping Agency being reinstated.

As a result of the ban, WADA plans to allow individually cleared Russian athletes to take part in the 2021–22 World Championships and 2022 Winter Olympics under a neutral banner, as instigated at the 2018 Winter Olympics, but they will not be permitted to compete in team sports. The title of the neutral banner has yet to be determined; WADA Compliance Review Committee head Jonathan Taylor stated that the IOC would not be able to use "Olympic Athletes from Russia" (OAR) as it did in 2018, emphasizing that neutral athletes cannot be portrayed as representing a specific country. Russia later filed an appeal to the Court of Arbitration for Sport (CAS) against the WADA decision.

After reviewing the case on appeal, CAS ruled on 17 December 2020 to reduce the penalty that WADA had placed on Russia. Instead of banning Russia from sporting events, the ruling allowed Russia to participate at the Olympics and other international events, but for a period of two years, the team cannot use the Russian name, flag, or anthem and must present themselves as "Neutral Athlete" or "Neutral Team". The ruling does allow for team uniforms to display "Russia" on the uniform as well as the use of the Russian flag colors within the uniform's design, although the name should be up to equal predominance as the "Neutral Athlete/Team" designation.

Schedule and course information
Thirteen events were scheduled and completed.

All times are local (UTC+1).

Course information

Medal summary

Medal table

Men's events

Women's events

Mixed

Participating countries
A total of 68 countries competed

 (5)
 (3)
 (5)
 (3)
 (2)
 (23)
 (1)
 (7)
 (1)
 (8)
 (3)
 (5)
 (13)
 (4)
 (1)
 (1)
 (8)
 (6)
 (7)
 (5)
 (2)
 (3)
 (17)
 (5)
 (13)
 (7)
 (12)
 (4)
 (9)
 (9)
 (2)
 (8)
 (3)
 (4)
 (24) (host nation)
 (4)
 (1)
 (3)
 (11)
 (8)
 (3)
 (5)
 (1)
 (2)
 (1)
 (5)
 (2)
 (1)
 (1)
 (4)
 (6)
 (13)
 (1)
 (2)
 (3)
 (3)
 (9)
 (2)
 (6)
 (6)
 (16)
 (1)
 (6)
 (11)
 (19)
 (1)
 (8)
 (17)

References

Notes

External links

 
2021 in alpine skiing
2021 in Italian sport
2021
Sport in Cortina d'Ampezzo
February 2021 sports events in Italy
International sports competitions hosted by Italy
Alpine skiing competitions in Italy